Pygmaepterys menoui is a species of sea snail, a marine gastropod mollusk in the family Muricidae, the murex snails or rock snails.

Description

Distribution
This marine species occurs off New Caledonia

References

 Houart R. (1990). Four new species of Muricidae from New Caledonia. Venus. 49(3): 205-214

Muricidae
Gastropods described in 1990